And So: On is the third album by American singer-songwriter Jimmy Webb, released in May 1971 by Reprise Records.

Background
Following the commercial failure of his second album, Words and Music, Webb was given a second chance by Reprise, who wanted a follow-up as soon as possible. In May 1971, only six months after the release of its predecessor, And So: On was released.

Composition
With his record company pressing for a quick follow-up release to Words and Music, Webb did not have time to write an entire album of new material. Only four of the songs carry a 1971 copyright date: "Met Her on a Plane", "Laspitch", "One Lady", and "If Ships Were Made to Sail". The rest of the songs date back as far as 1967's "Marionette". Ed Ames recorded "All My Love's Laughter" in 1968, and Thelma Houston recorded "Pocketful of Keys" in 1969. "Highpockets" and "Laspitch" were originally intended for a proposed Broadway musical.

Several songs from the album would later be covered successfully by other artists, including "See You Then" by Roberta Flack in 1971, "Met Her on a Plane" by Ian Matthews in 1972, "If Ships Were Made to Sail" by Scott Walker in 1973, and "Marionette" by Art Garfunkel in 1978.

Critical reception
In his review for Allmusic, William Ruhlmann called And So: On an album of "different moods that didn't quite hang together" and that the age of some of the songs evoked the sound of Webb's hit period rather than his recent Words and Music. Ruhlmann continued:

Track listing

Personnel
Music
 Jimmy Webb – vocals, keyboards
 Larry Coryell – guitar
 Freddy Tackett – guitar
 Tom Scott – alto saxophone
 Francie Lauridsen – flute, recorder 
 Lance Allworth – harmonica
 Skip Mosher – electric bass, tenor saxophone
 Ray Rich – percussion, drums
 Terry Brown – vocals
 The Good Sisters – vocals

Production
 Jimmy Webb – arrangements
 Sid Sharp – conductor
 Terry Brown – engineer
 Brian Ingoldsby – engineer
 Ed Thrasher – art direction
 Barry Feinstein – cover photography

References

1971 albums
Albums produced by Jimmy Webb
Jimmy Webb albums
Reprise Records albums